Sergei Kutsov (born 23 April 1977) is a retired Kyrgyzstani footballer.

In March 2014 Kutsov signed for newly promoted Kazakhstan Premier League side Spartak Semey.

He was a member of the Kyrgyzstan national football team between 1996 and 2001.

Club career stats

Achievements
Kyrgyzstan Cup
1997 :Alga-PVO Bishkek
1998 :SKA-PVO Bishkek
Kazakhstan Premier League
2004 :FC Kairat
Kazakhstan Cup
1999–2000 :FC Kairat
2001 :FC Kairat
2003 :FC Kairat

References

External links

1977 births
Living people
Kyrgyzstani footballers
Kyrgyzstani expatriate footballers
FC Alga Bishkek players
FC Kairat players
Expatriate footballers in Kazakhstan
Kyrgyzstani expatriate sportspeople in Kazakhstan
Kyrgyzstani people of Russian descent
Association football defenders
Kyrgyzstan international footballers